Choreoathetosis is the occurrence of involuntary movements in a combination of chorea (irregular migrating contractions) and athetosis (twisting and writhing).

It is caused by many different diseases and agents. It is a symptom of several diseases, including Lesch–Nyhan syndrome, phenylketonuria, and Huntington disease and can be a feature of kernicterus (rapidly increasing unconjugated bilirubin that cross the blood-brain-barrier in infants).

Choreoathetosis is also a common presentation of dyskinesia as a side effect of levodopa-carbidopa in the treatment of Parkinson disease.

The use of crack cocaine or amphetamines can result in conditions nicknamed crack dancing, or tweaking respectively, described as choreathetoid.

See also 
 Ulegyria

References

External links

Neurological disorders